Muhammad Reza Kusuma (born 7 February 2000) is an Indonesian professional footballer who plays as an attacking midfielder for Liga 1 club Bhayangkara.

Club career

HNK Primorac
In 2020, Reza joined HNK Primorac. Reza Kusuma made his debut with HNK Primorac on March 20, 2021, against NK OSK in week 17. HNK Primorac is a team playing in the South Zone Croatian League 3. Recently, Reza managed to gain a positive note with HNK Primorac. He was selected in the list of Team of The Week (11 players) week 20 Croatian League 3. That he got after scoring one goal in the match against NK Kamen. This is not the first time Reza has competed in European football. Previously, he had already joined Tercera División club Cristo Atlético.

Bhayangkara
He was signed for Bhayangkara to play in Liga 1 in the 2022 season. Reza made his league debut on 8 September 2022 in a match against Madura United at the Gelora Ratu Pamelingan Stadium, Pamekasan.

Career statistics

Club

Notes

References

External links
 
 
 Reza Kusuma at Liga Indonesia

2000 births
Living people
Indonesian footballers
Sportspeople from Jakarta
Liga 1 (Indonesia) players
Indonesian expatriate footballers
Association football midfielders